Egregia menziesii is a species of kelp known commonly as feather boa kelp.  It is the only species in the monotypic genus Egregia.  It is native to the coastline of western North America from Alaska to Baja California, where it is a common kelp of the intertidal zone.

Description
It is dark brown in color, shiny and bumpy in texture, and may reach over five meters long. It grows a branching stipe from a thick holdfast. It bears long, flat, straplike fronds lined with small blades each a few centimeters long. There are pneumatocysts at intervals along the fronds which provide buoyancy. The alga varies in morphology; the rachis, or central strip, of the frond may be smooth or corrugated, and the blades along the edge of the rachis may be a variety of shapes.

Usage
E. menziesii is used in baths or for thalassotherapy, along with species such as Turkish towel (Chondracanthus exasperatus), finger kelp (Laminaria digitata), and Fucus.

See also
Discurria insessa, a limpet endemic to Egregia

References

External links

marine.gov Profile
Jepson Diagram and Abundances
AlgaeBase

Lessoniaceae
Monotypic brown algae genera